Taranchi is a term denoting the Muslim sedentary population living in oases around the Tarim Basin in today's Xinjiang, China, whose native language is Turkic Karluk and whose ancestral heritages include Tocharians, Iranic peoples such as Sakas and Sogdians, and the later Turkic peoples such as the Uyghurs, Karluks, Yaghmas, Chigils, Basmyls, Tuhsis and lastly, the Mongolic tribes of the Chagatai Khanate.

Name
The same name – which simply means 'a farmer' in Chagatai – can be extended to agrarian populations of the Ferghana Valley and oases of the entire Central Asian Turkestan. Although the Tarim Basin (with such oases as Kashgar, Kumul, Khotan and Turpan) is the agrarian Taranchis' traditional homeland, they have during the Qing period on China, migrated to regions that are now Urumqi and Ili. Many Taranchis were encouraged to settle in the Ili valley alongside sedentary Xibe garrisons and the nomadic Kyrgyz by the Qing military governors after the conquest of the Dzungars by the Chinese. In the multiethnic Muslim culture of Xinjiang, the term Taranchi is considered contradistinctive to Sart, which denotes towns dwelling traders and craftsmen. It of course excluded the ruling classes of the oases Muslim states, often called Moghol/Mughal because of the Chagatay-Timurid dynasties or Dolan because of the Doglat nobility. However, from a modern perspective, Taranchi, Sart and Moghol Dolans cannot be considered three distinctive ethnic groups, but rather three different classes or castes in the same cultural-linguistic zone that was Chagatay-Timurid.

In the early 20th century, the geopolitical Great Game between Russia and Great Britain resulted in the division of Central Asia among modern nation-states. All oases farmers native to Xinjiang became part of Uyghur nationality by 1934. While most Sarts of oases or Ili Valley towns became part of the Uyghur nationality, those with particularly strong ties to regions west of Xinjiang became Uzbeks. Sometimes such divisions are very arbitrary, because Kashgaris can be as distinctive from Turpanliks as they are from Andijanliks.

History 

The Turkic Muslim sedentary people of the Tarim Basin were originally ruled by the Chagatai Khanate while the nomadic Buddhist Oirat Mongol in Dzungaria ruled over the Dzungar Khanate. The Naqshbandi Sufi Khojas, descendants of the Prophet Muhammad, had replaced the Chagatayid Khans as the ruling authority of the Tarim Basin in the early 17th century. There was a struggle between two factions of Khojas, the Afaqi (White Mountain) faction and the Ishaqi (Black Mountain) faction. The Ishaqi defeated the Afaqi, which resulted in the Afaq Khoja inviting the 5th Dalai Lama, the leader of the Tibetan Buddhists, to intervene on his behalf in 1677. The 5th Dalai Lama then called upon his Dzungar Buddhist followers in the Zunghar Khanate to act on this invitation. The Dzungar Khanate then conquered the Tarim Basin in 1680, setting up the Afaqi Khoja as their puppet ruler.

Khoja Afaq asked the 5th Dalai Lama when he fled to Lhasa to help his Afaqi faction take control of the Tarim Basin (Kashgaria). The Dzungar leader Galdan was then asked by the Dalai Lama to restore Khoja Afaq as ruler of Kashgararia. Khoja Afaq collaborated with Galdan's Dzungars when the Dzungars conquered the Tarim Basin from 1678-1680 and set up the Afaqi Khojas as puppet client rulers. The Dalai Lama blessed Galdan's conquest of the Tarim Basin and Turfan Basin.

67,000 patman of grain (each patman is 4 piculs and 5 pecks, or roughly 4,800 kg + 44 litres of dry rice) and 48,000 silver ounces were required to be paid yearly by Kashgar to the Dzungars, and the rest of the cities were also taxed. Trade, milling, and distilling taxes, corvée labor, saffron, cotton, and grain were also extracted by the Dzungars from the Tarim Basin. Every harvest season, women and food had to be provided to Dzungars when they came to extract the taxes from them.

When the Dzungars levied the traditional nomadic Alban poll tax upon the Muslims of Altishahr, the Muslims viewed it as the payment of jizyah (a tax traditionally taken from non-Muslims by Muslim conquerors).

Involvement of Qing dynasty China 
The Turkic Muslims of the Turfan and Kumul Oases then submitted to the Qing dynasty of China, and asked China to free them from the Dzungars. The Qing accepted the rulers of Turfan and Kumul as Qing vassals. The Qing dynasty waged war against the Dzungars for decades until finally defeating them and then Qing Manchu Bannermen carried out the Zunghar genocide, nearly wiping them from existence and depopulating Dzungaria. The Qing then freed the Afaqi Khoja leader Burhan-ud-din and his brother Khoja Jihan from their imprisonment by the Dzungars, and appointed them to rule as Qing vassals over the Tarim Basin. The Khoja brothers decided to renege on this deal and declare themselves as independent leaders of the Tarim Basin. The Qing and the Turfan leader Emin Khoja crushed their revolt and China then took full control of both Dzungaria and the Tarim Basin by 1759.

Some Taranchis resettled to Dzungaria.

Taranchi was the name for Turki agriculturalists who were resettled in Dzungaria from the Tarim Basin oases ("East Turkestani cities") by the Qing dynasty, along with Manchus, Xibo (Xibe), Solons, Han and other ethnic groups. The Manchu Qing policy of settling Chinese colonists and Taranchis from the Tarim Basin on the former Dzungar land was described as having the land "swarmed" with the settlers. The amount of Uyghurs moved by the Qing from Altä-shähär (Tarim Basin) to depopulated Zunghar land in Ili numbered around 10,000 families. The amount of Uyghurs moved by the Qing into Jungharia (Dzungaria) at this time has been described as "large". The Qing settled in Dzungaria even more Turki-Taranchi (Uyghurs) numbering around 12,000 families originating from Kashgar in the aftermath of the Jahangir Khoja invasion in the 1820s. Standard Uyghur is based on the Taranchi dialect, which was chosen by the Chinese government for this role. Salar migrants from Amdo (Qinghai) came to settle the region as religious exiles, migrants, and as soldiers enlisted in the Chinese army to fight in Ili, often following the Hui.

The Taranchi revolted against the Qing dynasty during the Dungan revolt. At first, they cooperated with the Dungans, but turned on them, massacring the Dungans at Kuldja and driving the rest through Talk pass to the Ili valley.

References

Bibliography

Agglutinative languages
Ethnic groups in China
Uyghur sub-ethnic groups